Moradkhanlu (also Romanized as Morādkhānlū) is a village in Marhemetabad-e Miyani Rural District, Marhemetabad District, Miandoab County, West Azerbaijan Province, Iran. At the 2006 census, its population was 633, in 141 families.

References 

Populated places in Miandoab County